Jure Pelko (born May 17, 1990) is a Slovenian professional basketball player for KD Ilirija of the Premier A Slovenian Basketball League. He is a 1.90 m tall combo guard.

Professional career
In August 2016, he signed a one-year deal with Union Olimpija.

On June 21, 2017, he signed a two-years deal with Helios Suns. He played for BK Olomoucko in the 2018-19 season. Pelko spent the 2019-20 season with Helios Suns, averaging 12.4 points, 2.7 rebounds and 5.0 assists per game. On September 14, 2020, he signed with Rogaška.

In February 2021, he signed for Sutjeska. On December 17, Pelko signed with Bistrica. On January 27, 2022, he signed with KD Ilirija.

References

External links
 Eurobasket.com profile
 FIBA profile

1990 births
Living people
KK Olimpija players
KK Sutjeska players
People from Ptuj
Point guards
Shooting guards
Slovenian expatriate basketball people in Austria
Slovenian men's basketball players
Helios Suns players
Slovenian expatriate basketball people in the Czech Republic
Slovenian expatriate basketball people in Montenegro